Okanagana synodica, the walking cicada, is a species of cicada in the family Cicadidae. It is found in North America.

Subspecies
These two subspecies belong to the species Okanagana synodica:
 Okanagana synodica nigra Davis, 1944
 Okanagana synodica synodica (Say, 1825)

References

Further reading

External links

 

Insects described in 1825
Okanagana